Rosa Mundi is a 2001 album by folk singer June Tabor. It is a concept album that represents Tabor's exploration of the rose as a symbol of love, of beauty and hope. As a folk singer, Tabor’s primary sources are traditional but it is her secondary source choices, ranging from Tchaikovsky to a Great War ballad via Robbie Burns and a version of a German traditional piano song "Es Ist ein Rose Ersprungen", that separate this album from being a generalist folk music album. Tabor's singing is understated, reflecting her desire for the songs to be centre stage.

The album was reviewed favourably by a number of British music critics. RootsWorlds Jim Foley described Rosa Mundi in positive terms. In The Guardian Robin Denselow praised Rosa Mundi, and commented that Tabor's work demonstrated a commitment to the art of song with each song sung with Tabor's distinctive vocals. The article praised Tabor as amongst the finest of contemporary folk  singers. A separate RootsWorld review said that Rosa Mundi was outstanding and that Tabor was a contemporary singer of importance with an ability to express herself with clarity and beauty. British folk music magazine fRoots reviewed the album at the time of release, and had championed Tabor for over twenty years, republishing an interview with Tabor in the final issue in 2019.

Track listing
 "Roses of Picardy" (words & music: Fred Weatherly)
 "Belle Rose" (traditional) 
 "Deep in Love" (traditional)
 "O My Luve's Like a Red Red Rose" (words: Robert Burns/tune: traditional)
 "Rose in June" (traditional)
 "Paint Me, Redouté" (words: Les Barker / tune: Tabor & Emmerson)
 "Rhosyn Wyn / Winterrose aka Es Ist ein Rose Ersprungen"  (trad 15th century German /arr. Tabor, Warren, Emerson, Bolton)
 "The Rose Is White, The Rose Is Red/ Dargason" (traditional) / tune: music in manuscript)
 "The Crown of Roses (Tchaikovsky's legend)" (words: Plechteev/ tune: Tchaikovsky/ arrangement: Tabor, Warren, Emerson, Bolton)
 "Barbary Ellen" (trad) (Child 84, Roud 54)
 "Maybe I'll Be a Rose" (words :Les Barker/ tune: Savourna Stevenson)

Personnel
 June Tabor – vocals
 Huw Warren – piano
 Mark Emerson – viola, violin
 Richard Bolton – cello

References

2001 albums
June Tabor albums
Topic Records albums